Aplysia is a genus of medium-sized to extremely large sea slugs, specifically sea hares, which are one clade of large sea slugs, marine gastropod mollusks.

These benthic herbivorous creatures can become rather large compared with most other mollusks. They graze in tidal and subtidal zones of tropical waters, mostly in the Indo-Pacific Ocean (23 species); but they can also be found in the Atlantic Ocean (12 species), with a few species occurring in the Mediterranean.

Aplysia species, when threatened, frequently release clouds of ink, it is believed in order to blind the attacker (though they are in fact considered edible by relatively few species).  Following the lead of Eric R. Kandel, the genus has been studied as a model organism by neurobiologists, because its gill and siphon withdrawal reflex, as studied in Aplysia californica,  is mediated by electrical synapses, which allow several neurons to fire synchronously. This quick neural response is necessary for a speedy reaction to danger by the animal. Aplysia has only about 20,000 neurons, making it a favorite subject for investigation by neuroscientists. Also, the 'tongue' on the underside is controlled by only two neurons, which allowed complete mapping of the innervation network to be carried out.

Long-term memory
In neurons that mediate several forms of long-term memory in Aplysia, the DNA repair enzyme poly ADP ribose polymerase 1 (PARP-1) is activated.  In virtually all eukaryotic cells tested, the addition of polyADP-ribosyl groups to proteins (polyADP-ribosylation) occurs as a response to DNA damage. Thus the finding of activation of PARP-1 during learning and its requirement for long-term memory was surprising.  Cohen-Aromon et al. suggested that fast and transient decondensation of chromatin structure by polyADP-ribosylation enables the transcription needed to form long-term memory without strand-breaks in DNA.  Subsequent to these findings in Aplysia, further research was done with mice and it was found that polyADP-ribosylation is also required for long-term memory formation in mammals.

In 2018, scientists from the University of California, Los Angeles, have shown that the behavioral modifications characteristic of a form of nonassociative long-term memory in Aplysia can be transferred by RNA.

Operant conditioning 
Operant conditioning is considered a form of associative learning. Because operant conditioning involves intricate interaction between an action and a stimulus (in this case food) it is closely associated with the acquisition of compulsive behavior. The Aplysia species serve as an ideal model system for the physical studying of food-reward learning, due to "the neuronal components of parts of its ganglionic nervous system that are responsible for the generation of feeding movements." As a result, Aplysia has been used in associative learning studies to derive certain aspects of feeding and operant conditioning in the context of compulsive behavior.

In Aplysia, the primary reflex studied by scientists while studying operant conditioning is the gill and siphon withdrawal reflex. The gill and siphon withdrawal reflex allows the Aplysia to pull back its siphon and gill for protection. The links between the synapses during the gill and siphon withdrawal reflex are directly correlated with many behavioral traits in the Aplysia such as its habits, reflexes, and conditioning. Scientists have studied the conditioning of the Aplysia to identify correlations with conditioning in mammals, mainly regarding behavioral responses such as addiction. Through experiments on the conditioning of the Aplysia, links have been discovered with the synaptic plasticity for reward functions involved in the trait of addiction within mammals. Synaptic plasticity is the idea that the synapses will become stronger or weaker depending on how much those specific synapses are used. Conditioning of these synapses can lead them to become stronger or weaker by causing the neurons to fire or not fire when influenced by a stimulus. The conditioning of behavioral traits is based on the idea of a reward function. A reward function is when a stimulus is conditioned to fire according to a certain stimulus. The neurons will adapt to that stimulus, and fire those neurons more easily, even if the stimulus has a negative effect on the subject (in this case the Aplysia). In mammals, the reward function is mainly controlled by ventral tegmental area (VTA) dopamine neurons. During conditioning (in mammals), the VTA dopamine neurons have an increased effect on the stimuli being conditioned, and a decreased effect on the stimuli not being conditioned. This induces the synapses to form an expectation for reward for the stimuli being conditioned. The properties of the synapses displayed in the tests on conditioning involving the Aplysia (which has dopamine neurons but not a ventral tegmental area) are proposed to be directly comparable to behavioral responses such as addiction in mammals.

Reproduction
Aplysia are simultaneous hermaphrodites, meaning each adult individual sea hare possesses both male and female reproductive structures that may be mature at the same time.

Aplysia have the ability to store and digest allosperm (sperm from a partner) and often mate with multiple partners.  A potent sex pheromone, the water-borne protein attractin, is employed in promoting and maintaining mating in Aplysia. Attractin interacts with three other Aplysia protein pheromones (enticin, temptin or seductin) in a binary fashion to stimulate mate attraction.

Studies of multiple matings in the California sea hare, Aplysia californica, have provided insights on how conflicts between the sexes are resolved.

Self-defense 
Aplysia species was once thought to use ink to escape from predators, much like the octopus. Instead, recent research has made it clear that these sea slugs are able to produce and secrete multiple compounds within their ink, including the chemodeterrant Aplysioviolin and toxic substances such as ammonia for self-defense. The ability of the Aplysia species to hold toxins within their bodies without poisoning itself is a result of the unique way that the toxin is stored within the slug. Different molecules essential to the creation of the toxin are accumulated in separate parts of the body of the slug, rendering them benign, as only the mixing of all the molecules can result in a toxic chemical cloud. When the sea hare feels threatened it immediately begins the process of defending itself by mixing the distinct molecules in an additional part of the body used specifically for that purpose. At which point, enzymes within the sea slug begin the process of making the substance toxic, and the mixture is ejected out at the predator in self-defense.

Species
Species within the genus Aplysia are as follows.
This list follows the studies of Medina et al. who established a phylogenetic hypothesis for the genus Aplysia through study of the partial mitochondrial DNA (mtDNA) sequence data of ribosomal genes (rDNA).

 Aplysia argus Rüppell & Leuckart, 1830
 Aplysia atromarginata Bergh, 1905
 Aplysia brasiliana Rang, 1828
Aplysia californica (J.G. Cooper, 1863) California sea hare
Distribution: Northeast Pacific
Aplysia cedrocensis (Bartsch & Rehder, 1939)
Distribution: Northeast Pacific
Aplysia cervina (Dall & Simpson, 1901)
Distribution: West Atlantic
Aplysia cornigera Sowerby, 1869
Distribution: Indian Ocean, West Pacific
Aplysia cronullae Eales, 1960: synonym of Aplysia extraordinaria (Allan, 1932) (uncertain synonym)
Distribution: Southwest Pacific
Aplysia dactylomela (Rang, 1828) spotted sea hare
Distribution: Cosmopolitan; tropical and temperate seas.
Color: from pale gray to green to dark brown.
Description: large black rings on the mantle; good swimmer
Aplysia denisoni Smith, 1884: synonym of Aplysia extraordinaria (Allan, 1932) (possible senior synonym)
Distribution: Indian Ocean, West Pacific
Aplysia depilans (Gmelin, 1791)
Distribution: Northeast Atlantic, Mediterranean.
Description: thin, yellow inner shell
Aplysia dura Eales, 1960
Distribution: Southeast Atlantic, Southwest Pacific
 Aplysia elongata (Pease, 1860)
Aplysia euchlora Adams in M.E.Gray, 1850: represented as Aplysia (Phycophila) euchlora (Gray, 1850) (alternate representation)
Distribution: Northwest Pacific
Aplysia extraordinaria (Allan, 1932) (possibly = Aplysia gigantea)
Distribution: Western Australia, New Zealand.
Length: more than 40 cm
Aplysia fasciata (Poiret, 1798) ( Aplysia brasiliana Rang, 1828 is a junior synonym).
Distribution: East Atlantic, Mediterranean, West Africa, Red Sea
Length: 40 cm
Color: dark brown to black.
Description: sometimes has a red border to the parapodia and oral tentacles
 Aplysia ghanimii Golestani, Crocetta, Padula, Camacho, Langeneck, Poursanidis, Pola, Yokeş, Cervera, Jung, Gosliner, Araya, Hooker, Schrödl & Valdés, 2019
Aplysia gigantea Sowerby, 1869
Distribution: Indian Ocean, West Pacific
 Aplysia hooveri Golestani, Crocetta, Padula, Camacho, Langeneck, Poursanidis, Pola, Yokeş, Cervera, Jung, Gosliner, Araya, Hooker, Schrödl & Valdés, 2019
Aplysia inca d'Orbigny, 1837
Distribution: Southeast Pacific
 Aplysia japonica G. B. Sowerby II, 1869
 Aplysia juanina (Bergh, 1898)
Aplysia juliana (Quoy & Gaimard, 1832) Walking sea hare
Distribution: cosmopolitan, circumtropical in all warm seas
Color: various, from uniform to pale brown
Description: no purple gland, therefore no ink secretions; posterior end of the foot can act as a sucker
Aplysia keraudreni Rang, 1828
Distribution: South Pacific
Length: 25 cm
Color: dark brown
Aplysia kurodai (Baba, 1937)
Distribution: NW Pacific
Length: 30 cm
Color: dark brown to purplish black, dotted with white spots
 Aplysia lineolata A. Adams & Reeve, 1850: synonym of Aplysia oculifera A. Adams & Reeve, 1850
Aplysia maculata Rang, 1828
Distribution : Western Indian Ocean
Aplysia morio (A. E. Verrill, 1901) Atlantic black sea hare, sooty sea hare
Distribution: Northwest Atlantic
Length: 40 cm
Color: black to deep brown; no spots
Aplysia nigra d'Orbigny, 1837
Distribution: Southwest Atlantic, South Pacific
Aplysia nigra brunnea Hutton, 1875
Distribution: New Zealand
Length: 10 cm
Color: dark brown
 Aplysia nigrocincta von Martens, 1880
Aplysia oculifera (Adams & Reeve, 1850) spotted sea hare
Distribution: Indian Ocean; West Pacific; common along the north, east and south coast of South Africa
Length: 15 cm
Description: greenish brown, with small brown to black spots with white centres
Habitat: shallow bays and estuaries
Behaviour: hides by day; emerges at night to feed on seaweed
 Aplysia parva Pruvot-Fol, 1953
Aplysia parvula (Guilding in Moerch, 1863) pygmy sea hare, dwarf sea hare
Distribution: worldwide in warm to temperate seas
Length: 6 cm
Color: brown to green spots
 Aplysia peasei (Tryon, 1895) (taxon inquirendum)
 Aplysia perviridis (Pilsbry, 1895)
 Aplysia pilsbryi (Letson, 1898)
 Aplysia pulmonica Gould, 1852
Aplysia punctata (Cuvier, 1803)
Distribution: NE Atlantic
Length: 20 cm
Color: very variable
Aplysia rehderi Eales, 1960
Distribution: Northeast Pacific
Aplysia reticulata Eales, 1960
Distribution: Southwest Pacific
Aplysia reticulopoda (Beeman, 1960) net-foot sea hare
Distribution: Northeast Pacific
Aplysia robertsi Pilsbry, 1895
Distribution: Northeast Pacific
Aplysia rudmani Bebbington, 1974
Distribution: Indian Ocean
Aplysia sagamiana (Baba, 1949)
Distribution: East Australia, Japan; Northwest Pacific
Aplysia sowerbyi Pilsbry, 1895
Distribution: Southwest Pacific
Aplysia sydneyensis (Sowerby, 1869)
Distribution: Australia
Length: 15 cm
Description: not clearly defined
Aplysia tanzanensis Bebbington, 1974
Distribution: Indian Ocean
Aplysia vaccaria (Winkler, 1955) California black sea hare (possibly ?= Aplysia cedrocensis)
Distribution: Pacific Coast of California
Length: very big – up to 75 cm
Color: black
Description: no purple ink; huge internal shell
 Aplysia venosa Hutton, 1875 (taxon inquirendum)
 Aplysia vistosa Pruvot-Fol, 1953

Species brought into synonymy
 Aplysia aequorea Heilprin, 1888: synonym of Aplysia dactylomela Rang, 1828
 Aplysia albopunctata Deshayes, 1853: synonym of Aplysia punctata (Cuvier, 1803)
 Aplysia angasi G.B. Sowerby II, 1869: synonym of Aplysia dactylomela Rang, 1828
 Aplysia annulifera Thiele, 1930: synonym of Aplysia dactylomela Rang, 1828
 Aplysia ascifera Rang, 1828: synonym of Dolabrifera dolabrifera (Rang, 1828)
 Aplysia benedicti Eliot, 1899: synonym of Aplysia dactylomela Rang, 1828
 Aplysia bourailli Risbec, 1951: synonym of Aplysia dactylomela Rang, 1828
Aplysia brasiliana (Rang, 1828) mottled sea hare, sooty sea hare (junior synonym of Aplysia fasciata; different geographical populations of the same species): synonym of Aplysia fasciata Poiret, 1789
 Aplysia cirrhifera Quoy & Gaimard, 1832: synonym of Barnardaclesia cirrhifera (Quoy & Gaimard, 1832)
 Aplysia concava Sowerby, 1869: synonym of Aplysia parvula Mørch, 1863
 Aplysia depressa Cantraine, 1835: synonym of Phyllaplysia depressa (Cantraine, 1835)
 Aplysia dolabrifera Rang, 1828: synonym of Dolabrifera dolabrifera (Rang, 1828)
Aplysia donca (Ev. Marcus & Er. Marcus, 1960): synonym of Aplysia morio (A. E. Verrill, 1901)
 Aplysia eusiphonata Bergh, 1908: synonym of Aplysia maculata Rang, 1828
 Aplysia fimbriata Adams & Reeve, 1850: synonym of Aplysia dactylomela Rang, 1828
 Aplysia gargantua Bergh, 1908: synonym of Aplysia maculata Rang, 1828
Aplysia geographica (Adams & Reeve, 1850): synonym of Syphonota geographica (A. Adams & Reeve, 1850)
 Aplysia gilchristi Bergh, 1908: synonym of Aplysia maculata Rang, 1828
 Aplysia gracilis Eales, 1960: synonym of Aplysia fasciata Poiret, 1789
 Aplysia griffithsiana Leach, 1852 synonym of Aplysia punctata (Cuvier, 1803)
 Aplysia guttata Sars M., 1840 synonym of Aplysia punctata (Cuvier, 1803)
 Aplysia hamiltoni Kirk, 1882: synonym of Aplysia juliana Quoy & Gaimard, 1832
 Aplysia hybrida Sowerby, 1806: synonym of Aplysia punctata (Cuvier, 1803)
 Aplysia longicauda Quoy & Gaimard, 1825: synonym of Stylocheilus longicauda (Quoy & Gaimard, 1825)
 Aplysia megaptera Verrill, 1900: synonym of Aplysia dactylomela Rang, 1828
 Aplysia nettiae Winkler, 1959: synonym of Aplysia californica J. G. Cooper, 1863
 Aplysia norfolkensis Sowerby, 1869: synonym of Aplysia parvula Mørch, 1863
 Aplysia oahouensis Souleyet, 1852: synonym of Dolabrifera dolabrifera (Rang, 1828)
 Aplysia ocellata d'Orbigny, 1839: synonym of Aplysia dactylomela Rang, 1828
 Aplysia odorata Risbec, 1928: synonym of Aplysia dactylomela Rang, 1828
 Aplysia operta Burne, 1906: synonym of Aplysia dactylomela Rang, 1828
 Aplysia petalifera Rang, 1828: synonym of Petalifera petalifera (Rang, 1828)
 Aplysia poikilia Bergh, 1908: synonym of Aplysia maculata Rang, 1828
 Aplysia protea Rang, 1828: synonym of Aplysia dactylomela Rang, 1828
 Aplysia pulmonica Gould, 1852: synonym of Aplysia argus Rüppell & Leuckart, 1830
 Aplysia radiata Ehrenberg, 1831: synonym of Aplysia dactylomela Rang, 1828
 Aplysia rosea Rathke, 1799: synonym of Aplysia punctata (Cuvier, 1803)
 Aplysia schrammi Deshayes, 1857: synonym of Aplysia dactylomela Rang, 1828
 Aplysia scutellata Ehrenberg, 1831: synonym of Aplysia dactylomela Rang, 1828
 Aplysia sibogae Bergh, 1905: synonym of Aplysia juliana Quoy & Gaimard, 1832
 Aplysia striata Quoy & Gaimard, 1832: synonym of Stylocheilus longicauda (Quoy & Gaimard, 1825)
 Aplysia tigrina Rang, 1828: synonym of Aplysia dactylomela Rang, 1828
 Aplysia tigrinella Gray, 1850: synonym of Aplysia maculata Rang, 1828
 Aplysia tigrinella Gray, 1850: synonym of Aplysia maculata Rang, 1828
 Aplysia velifer Bergh, 1905: synonym of Aplysia dactylomela Rang, 1828
Aplysia willcoxi (Hellprin, 1886): synonym of Aplysia fasciata Poiret, 1789
Aplysia winneba Eales, 1957: synonym of Aplysia fasciata Poiret, 1789

References

 Kandel Eric R., Schwartz, J.H., Jessell, T.M. 2000. Principles of Neural Science, 4th ed., p. 180. McGraw-Hill, New York.

 Howson, C.M.; Picton, B.E. (Ed.) (1997). The species directory of the marine fauna and flora of the British Isles and surrounding seas. Ulster Museum Publication, 276. The Ulster Museum: Belfast, UK. . vi, 508 (+ cd-rom) pp
 Gofas, S.; Le Renard, J.; Bouchet, P. (2001). Mollusca, in: Costello, M.J. et al. (Ed.) (2001). European register of marine species: a check-list of the marine species in Europe and a bibliography of guides to their identification. Collection Patrimoines Naturels, 50: pp. 180–213

External links

 
 Photos of Aplysia - MondoMarino.net
 Cunha, C. M.; Rosenberg, G. (2019). Type specimens of Aplysiida (Gastropoda, Heterobranchia) in the Academy of Natural Sciences of Philadelphia, with taxonomic remarks. Zoosystematics and Evolution. 95(2): 361-372

 
Animal models
Animal models in neuroscience
Taxa named by Carl Linnaeus
Gastropod genera